Grass Creek is an unincorporated community in Hot Springs County, Wyoming, United States. The Legend Rock Petroglyph Site, which is listed on the National Register of Historic Places, is located near Grass Creek.

Grass Creek had its own school until 1974, when it closed due to low enrollment. It also had a post office with ZIP Code 82425, which operated through at least 1977.

References

Unincorporated communities in Wyoming
Unincorporated communities in Hot Springs County, Wyoming